Escapes is a 2017 documentary film about the life of flamenco dancer, actor, and Blade Runner screenwriter Hampton Fancher directed by Michael Almereyda.

Reception
Ryan Swen of seattlescreenscene.com called the film "quietly spectacular, stylish, and moving."

Ray Pride of newcityfilm.com called the film a "captivating experimental interview documentary".

Hunter Lanier of filmthreat.com describes the documentary's style, explaining that "Almereyda chooses to fill the screen with clips from various films and TV shows that match the beats in Fancher’s story" and criticizing this technique for being "both distracting and narratively impotent."

References

External links 

2017 documentary films
American biographical films
Films directed by Michael Almereyda
Documentary films about actors
Documentary films about flamenco
Documentary films about writers
American documentary films
2010s English-language films
2010s American films